The single overhead cam V6 engine introduced in 1993 was a major advancement for Chrysler. It was derived from Chrysler's first homegrown front-wheel drive V6, the Chrysler 3.3 engine. The SOHC V6 has been replaced by the Chrysler Pentastar engine.

There are three major variants of this basic design: the 3.5 L, 3.2 L, and 4.0 L. Additionally, a 2.7 L DOHC version was derived.

History

1993–97 3.5 L engines are a non-interference engine meaning that the valves will not collide with the pistons in the event of a timing belt failure. The 1998–2001 3.2 L, the 1998–2010 3.5 L, and the 2007–2011 4.0 L engines are interference designs.

3.5

The 3.5L version has an intake arrangement with two separate manifolds and throttle bodies connected with a crossover valve. This provides better low and midrange torque. Another difference with the 3.5 as opposed to the 3.3 is that it has a timing belt, not a timing chain. The water pump is also driven by the timing belt on the 3.5, whereas on the 3.3, the accessory belt drives it.

The EGK was discontinued in 2004.

The 3.5 L variant is no longer in production as of 2011, replaced by the newer Pentastar 3.6 V6.

EGE
 1993-1997 Dodge Intrepid
 1994-1996 Chrysler New Yorker
 1994-1997 Chrysler LHS
 1993-1997 Chrysler Concorde
 1993-1997 Eagle Vision
 1997 Plymouth Prowler
 EGF
 2007-2010 Chrysler Sebring
 2008-2010 Dodge Avenger
 2009-2010 Dodge Journey
 EGJ
 2002-2004 Chrysler Concorde LXi
 2002-2004 Dodge Intrepid ES
 EGG
 1999-2001 Chrysler LHS
 1999-2004 Chrysler 300M
 1999-2001 Plymouth Prowler
 2000-2004 Dodge Intrepid R/T and SXT
 2001-2002 Chrysler Prowler
 2002-2004 Chrysler Concorde Limited
 2004-2006 Chrysler Pacifica (CS)
 2005-2010 Chrysler 300
 2005-2008 Dodge Magnum SXT
 2006-2010 Dodge Charger
 2009-2010 Dodge Challenger SE
EGK
 2002-2004 Chrysler 300M Special

3.2

The 3.2 L version came along with the updated LH platform in 1998. It was an SOHC 4-valve design displacing  with a smaller  bore but the same  stroke as the 3.5. It was discontinued after the 2001 model year.

Applications:
 1998–2001 Chrysler Concorde
 1998–2001 Dodge Intrepid

4.0
Like its family members, this is a SOHC engine and is built in Trenton, Michigan. DaimlerChrysler reportedly spent $155 million to expand the Trenton plant to manufacture this engine.
 
The 4.0 engine Produces:

Applications:
 2007–2011 Dodge Nitro
 2007–2008 Chrysler Pacifica (CS)
 2008–2010 Chrysler Town & Country
 2008–2010 Dodge Grand Caravan
 2009–2010 Volkswagen Routan

DOHC

The DOHC 2.7 L Chrysler LH engine is based on this same design, though the bore, stroke, and production site are different.

See also

List of Chrysler engines

References

SOHC
V6 engines